Jean Morel may refer to:

Jean Baptiste Morel (1662–1732), Flemish still life painter
Jean-Marie Morel (1728–1810), French author, architect and surveyor 
Jean-Valentin Morel (1794–1860), French gold- and silversmith
Jean Morel (politician) (1854–1927), French politician
Jean Paul Morel (1903–1975), French-American conductor